Jondaryan is a rural town and locality in the Toowoomba Region, Queensland, Australia.

Geography
The Western railway line passes through the locality. The now-closed Jondaryan railway station served the town, while the Malu railway station on the boundary of the localities of Jondaryn and Malu is still operational.

History
The name Jondaryan derives from pastoral run name first used 1841 by Henry Dennis. It is believed to be an Aboriginal word meaning a long way off. The town was surveyed in June 1871 by surveyor G.T. Weale.

Jondaryan Post Office opened on 1 March 1867.

H.R.H. The Duke of Edinburgh stayed overnight in Jondaryan, then the terminus of the railway line, on 26 February 1868.

Jondaryan Provisional School opened on 12 February 1872. On 31 January 1876 it became Jondaryan State School.

In June 2015, the closed St Jude's Anglican church was relocated from Acland to the Jondaryan Woolshed to be used as a wedding chapel.

Heritage listings
Jondaryan has a number of heritage-listed sites, including:
 Evanslea Road: Jondaryan Homestead
 Evanslea Road: Jondaryan Woolshed
 Evanslea Road: St Anne's Anglican Church

Facilities

The Roadhouse 
The Cobb & Co. Roadhouse is located on the edge of the highway and is a popular stop for travellers from Dalby to Toowoomba. It is owned by Ampol. It is also a timetabled stop for the following intercity bus services provided by Greyhound Australia:

 GX493 - Brisbane to Mt. Isa via Toowoomba 
 GX494 - Mt. Isa to Brisbane via Toowoomba
 GX495 - Brisbane to Charleville via Toowoomba
 GX496 - Charleville to Brisbane via Toowoomba

Agrifac
Beside the Cobb & Co. Roadhouse is Agrifac, a warehouse that sells Machinery and Their Parts.

The Pub
The Jondaryan Pub was founded in the 1800s and is a popular place for travellers to stop in and have a drink.

Library Services
Library services in Jondaryan are provided by the Toowoomba Regional Council's mobile library service. The van visits Jondaryan State School  on the 2nd and 4th Tuesday of each month.

Volunteer Rural Fire Brigade Station
The Jondaryan Rural Fire Brigade Station provides Rural Fire Services to both the Jondaryan and the broader community, on a Voluntary per-call basis. It is headed by First Officer Damien Cooke.

Education 
Jondaryan State School is a government primary (Prep-6) school for boys and girls at Scott Road. In 2017, the school had an enrolment of 47 students with 4 teachers (3 full-time equivalent) and 6 non-teaching staff (3 full-time equivalent).

The closest secondary schools to Jondaryan are Oakey State High School in Oakey  to the east  and Dalby State High School and Our Lady of the Southern Cross College in Dalby,  to the west.

Events 
Jackie Howe Festival is held at the Woolshed at Jondaryan every year during the first weekend in September. At the festival the shearing shed comes to life under steam power. The old Australian Heritage Festival with its working historic farm machinery is now included in the Jackie Howe Festival. A major wool fashion show is a part of the Jackie Howe Festival. The best of Australian traditional country foods are featured at the festival.

References

External links

 
 Town map of Jondaryan, 1975

 
Toowoomba Region
Towns in Queensland
1871 establishments in Australia
Populated places established in 1871
Localities in Queensland